The Daily Worker was a newspaper published in New York City by the Communist Party USA, a formerly Comintern-affiliated organization. Publication began in 1924. While it generally reflected the prevailing views of the party, attempts were made to reflect a broader spectrum of left-wing opinion. At its peak, the newspaper achieved a circulation of 35,000. Contributors to its pages included Robert Minor and Fred Ellis (cartoonists), Lester Rodney (sports editor), David Karr, Richard Wright, John L. Spivak, Peter Fryer, Woody Guthrie and Louis F. Budenz.

History

Origin

The origins of the Daily Worker begin with the weekly Ohio Socialist published by the Socialist Party of Ohio in Cleveland from 1917 to November 1919.  The Ohio party joined the nascent Communist Labor Party of America at the 1919 Emergency National Convention.

The Ohio Socialist only used whole numbers. Its final issue was #94 November 19, 1919. The Toiler continued this numbering, even though a typographical error made its debut issue #85 November 26, 1919. Beginning sometime in 1921 the volume number IV was added, perhaps reflecting the publications fourth year in print, though its issue numbers continued the whole number scheme. The final edition of the Toiler was Vol IV #207 January 28, 1922. The Worker continued the Toilers numbering during its run Vol. IV #208 February 2, 1922 to Vol. VI #310 January 12, 1924. The first edition of Daily worker was numbered Vol. I #311.

The Ohio Socialist became Toiler in November 1919.  In 1920, with the CLP going underground, Toiler became the party's "aboveground" newspaper published by "The Toiler Publishing Association."  It remained as the Cleveland aboveground publication of the CLP and its successors until February 1922.

In December 1921 the "aboveground" Workers Party of America was founded and the Toiler merged with Workers Council of the Workers' Council of the United States to found the six page weekly The Worker.

This became the Daily Worker beginning January 13, 1924.

In 1927, the newspaper moved from Chicago to New York.

Popular Front changes

In politics, the Daily Worker consistently adhered to a Stalinist party line from the time of Joseph Stalin's rise to power in the Soviet Union.  The paper maintained a series of correspondents in Moscow, including Vern Smith in the mid-1930s, who invariably depicted Soviet reality in the most favorable possible light. The paper upheld the verdicts of the Moscow trials, criticized at the time outside the USSR as show trials, and later exposed as having used fabricated evidence and extorted confessions.  The Daily Workers editorials constantly criticized all opponents of Stalinist socialism, including other communists, such as Leon Trotsky, who was assassinated at Stalin's order in 1940.

Beginning in the Popular Front period of the 1930s, when the party proclaimed that "Communism is Twentieth Century Americanism" and characterized itself as the heirs to the tradition of Washington and Lincoln,  the paper broadened its coverage of the arts and entertainment. In 1935 it established a sports page, with contributions from David Karr, the page was edited and frequently written by Lester Rodney. The paper's sports coverage combined enthusiasm for baseball with the usual Marxist social critique of capitalist society and bourgeois attitudes. It advocated the desegregation of professional sports.

Post-World War II
The Daily Worker had constant financial and distribution problems. Many newsstands and stores would not carry the paper. The revelations of Soviet MVD spy rings inside the U.S. government, the 1945 revelations of former Daily Worker managing editor Louis F. Budenz, a self-admitted recruiter of agents for the Soviet NKVD (forerunner of the MVD and KGB), combined with the resultant intense anti-communism of the 1950s (labeled "McCarthyism") caused a large drop in the paper's circulation.

The membership of the American Communist Party had fallen to around 20,000 in 1956, when Khrushchev's speech to the 20th Congress of the CPSU (the "Secret Speech") on the personality cult of Stalin became known. The paper printed articles in support for the early stages of the 1956 Hungarian Revolution, a popular revolt by the Hungarian people against continued domination by the Soviet Union, which subsequently installed a puppet regime, the János Kádár government, in Budapest and had begun to persecute its political opponents. The Daily Worker's editor, John Gates opened the paper for discussion of the topic, a novel event for a party-line newspaper, and one appeared to promise further liberalization and dialogue inside the Communist Party in the United States.

Despite widespread dissension in the CPUSA, the paper finally endorsed Moscow's suppression of the Hungarian uprising.  In the disruptions that followed, about half of the remaining party membership left, including Gates and many staff members of the Daily Worker. Owing to greatly reduced operating income associated with a reduced membership, the CPUSA was forced to cease publication of a daily paper, with the final issue of the Daily Worker appearing on January 13, 1958.

After a short hiatus, the party published a weekend paper called The Worker from 1958 until 1968. A Tuesday edition called The Midweek Worker was added in 1961 and also continued until 1968, when production was accelerated. According to ex-CIA agent Philip Agee, a large number of subscribers during this period were CIA agents or front companies linked to the CIA. Agee claimed that the CIA's funding prevented The Worker from having to cease publication.

Two newspapers and a merger

In 1968 the Communist Party resumed publication of a New York daily paper, now titled The Daily World. In 1986, the paper merged with the party's West Coast weekly paper, the People's World, which hewed slightly less closely to the Moscow political line than the New York party organization and paper had done. The new People’s Daily World published from 1987 until 1991, when daily publication was abandoned.

The paper cut back to a weekly issue and was retitled People's Weekly World (later retitled to People's World as to de-emphasize the weekly component). Print publication of the People's World ceased in 2010 in favor of an online edition.

Currently (2012), People's World claims that, "Peoplesworld.org is a daily news website of, for and by the 99% and the direct descendant of the Daily Worker." Its publisher is Long View Publishing Company. The online newspaper is a member of the International Labor Communications Association and is indexed in the Alternative Press Index. Its staff belong to the Newspaper Guild/CWA, AFL–CIO.

Masthead

1920s

 Maurice Becker, cartoonist
 Jacob Burck, cartoonist
 Walt Carmon, circulation manager
 Whittaker Chambers
  Kyle Crichton as "Robert Forsythe" (father of Robert Crichton)
 Paul Crouch
 Samuel Adams Darcy
 Fred Ellis, cartoonist
 Harry Freeman
 Sender Garlin
 Hugo Gellert, cartoonist
 Mike Gold, columnist
 Jolan Gross-Bettelheim, cartoonist
 L. E. Katterfeld ("New York representative")
 Robert Minor, cartoonist
 Richard B. Moore
 Harvey O'Connor ("effective editor")
 Moissaye Joseph Olgin

1930s

 Robert Bendiner
 Richard O. Boyer
 Louis F. Budenz, managing editor
 Ben Burns
 Benjamin J. Davis Jr., editor
 Theodore Dreiser
 Nelson Frank
 Harry Gannes, foreign editor
 Eugene Gordon
 Woody Guthrie, "Woody Sez" columnist for People's World
 Clarence Hathaway, editor
 Syd Hoff, cartoonist
 Jacob Kainen, cartoonist
 Sergey Nikolaevich Kurnakov
 Edna Lewis
 Walter Lowenfels
 Samuel Putnam
 Lester Rodney, sports writer
 Howard Rushmore
 Ryan Walker, cartoonist / editor
 Marguerite Young, Washington DC bureau chief

1940s

 Edith Anderson-Schröder, culture editor
 Bill Mardo
 Alexander Saxton

1950s

 John Gates
 Si Gerson, executive editor

Pamphlets
Before the Party established the Workers Library Publishers in late 1927, the party used the Daily Worker Publishing Company imprint to publish its pamphlets.
The state and revolution: Marxist teaching on the state and the task of the proletariat in the revolution by Vladimir Lenin Chicago: Daily Worker Pub. Co., 1924
The white terrorists ask for mercy Chicago; Published for the Workers Party of America by the Daily Worker Pub. Co. Feb 1925
Trade unions in America by William Z. Foster, Earl Browder and James Cannon Chicago, Ill. : Published for the Trade Union Educational League by the Daily worker 1925 (Little red library #1) alternate link
 Class Struggle vs. Class Collaboration. by Earl Browder  Chicago: Published for the Workers Party of America by the Daily worker publishing company, 1925 (The little red library #2) alternate link
 Principles of Communism: Engels's Original Draft of the Communist Manifesto. translated by Max Bedacht Chicago: Published for the Workers Party of America by the Daily worker 1925. (Little Red Library #3) alternate link
 Worker Correspondents: What? When? Where? Why? How? by William F. Dunne Chicago, Ill. : Published for the Workers Party of America by the Daily Worker Pub. Co., 1925 (The Little red library #4) alternate link
Poems for workers, an anthology edited by Manuel Gomez Chicago: Published for Workers Party of America by Daily Worker Pub. Co., 1925 (Little Red Library #5)
The theory and practice of Leninism by Joseph Stalin Chicago: Published for the Workers Party of America by the Daily Worker Pub. Co., 1925
 The Party Organization.  Chicago: Published for the Workers (Communist) Party by the Daily Worker Publishing Co. 1925
Leninism or Trotskyism by Joseph Stalin, Lev Kamenev and Grigory Zinovyev Chicago: Published for the Workers Party of America by the Daily Worker Pub. Co., 1925
Lenin: his life and work by Yemelyan Yaroslavsky Chicago: Daily Worker Pub. Co., 1925
The Movement for World Trade Union Unity. by Tom Bell Chicago: Daily Worker Pub. Co., 1925
British imperialism in India; speech delivered in the House of Commons, July 9, 1925 by Shapurji Saklatvala Chicago: Daily Worker Pub. Co., 1925
Fairy tales for workers' children by Hermynia Zur Mühlen, trans. by Ida Dailes Chicago, Ill., Daily Worker Pub. Co. 1925
The fourth national convention of the Workers (Communist) Party of America : Report of the Central Executive Committee to the 4th national convention held in Chicago, Illinois, August 21st to 30th, 1925 : resolutions of the Parity Commission and others. Chicago: Daily Worker Publishing Co., 1925
From the Third through the Fourth Convention of the Workers (Communist) Party of America  by Charles E. Ruthenberg Chicago, Ill. : Published for the Workers (Communist) Party of America by the Daily Worker Pub. Co., 1925
The international: words and music. [New York] : Daily Worker New York Agency, Dec 1925
Marx and Engels on revolution in America by Heinz Neumann Chicago : Daily Worker Pub. Co., 1926 (The little red library #6) alternate link
The damned agitator and other stories. by Michael Gold Chicago : Daily Worker Pub. Co.,  1926 (The little red library #7) alternate link
1871: the Paris commune by Max Shachtman Chicago: Daily Worker Pub. Co. 1926 (The little red library #8) alternate link
How class collaboration works by Bertram David Wolfe Chicago: Daily Worker Pub. Co. 1926 (The little red library #9) alternate link
The menace of opportunism; a contribution to the bolshevization of the Workers (Communist) Party. by Max Bedacht Chicago: Daily Worker Pub. Co.,  1926
The British strike : its background, its lessons by William F. Dunne Chicago: Daily Worker Pub. Co.,  1926
Passaic: The Story of a Struggle against Starvation Wages and for the Right to Organize. by Albert Weisbord Chicago; Published for the Workers (Communist) Party by the Daily Worker Pub. Co., November 1926.
Red cartoons from the daily worker, the workers monthly and the liberator: Communist publications Chicago, Ill. : Daily Worker Pub. Co., 1926
The awakening of China by James Dolsen Chicago, Ill. : Daily Worker Pub. Co., 1926
Labor conditions in China and its labor movement by James H Dolsen Chicago, Ill. : Daily Worker Pub. Co., 1926
Lenin on organization. by Vladimir Lenin Chicago, Ill. : Daily Worker Pub. Co., 1926
Elements of political education. Vol. I by Nikolai Bukharin, A Berdnikov and F Svetlov Chicago : Daily Worker, 1926
The case of Sacco and Vanzetti in cartoons from the Daily worker by Fred Ellis Chicago : Daily Worker, 1927 alternate link
Constitution of the U.S.S.R. by V Yarotsky and N Yekovsky Chicago : Daily Worker, 1927 (The little red library #10) alternate link
`Jim Connolly and the Irish rising of 1916 by G Schüller Chicago: Daily Worker Pub. Co.,  1926 (The little red library # 11) alternate link
Red cartoons of 1927 from the daily worker and the workers monthly Chicago ; New York : Daily Worker Pub. Co., 1927
China in revolt by Executive Committee of the Communist International New York, Daily Worker Pub. Co., 1927 The little red library #12 Alternate link
 The Labor Lieutenants of American Imperialism. by Jay Lovestone New York: Daily Worker Publishing Co., 1927.
Red cartoons from the Daily Worker 1928 New York : Daily Worker, 1928
1929 Red cartoons : reprinted from the daily worker  New York : Comprodaily Pub. Co., 1929
How to sell the Daily Worker. New York, Daily Worker, 1920s
Burning Daylight by Jack London New York, Daily Worker, 1930s
"Soviet dumping" fable: speech by Litvinov New York : Published for Daily Worker by Workers Library Publishers, 1931
Anti-soviet lies and the five-year plan: the "Holy" capitalist war against the Soviet Union by Max Bedacht New York: Published for Daily Worker by Workers Library Publishers, 1931
Dimitroff accuses by Georgi Dimitrov New York, Daily Worker, 1934
The iron heel by Jack London New York, Daily Worker, 1934
The ruling clawss by A Redfield New York, Daily Worker, 1935 (cartoons)
Hunger and revolt: cartoons, by Jacob Burck New York, Daily Worker, 1935
Martin Eden by Jack London New York, Daily Worker, 1937
How the Auto Workers Won William Z. Foster and William Z Foster New York: The Daily Worker, 1937
The Daily worker, heir to the great tradition, by Morris Schappes New York, Daily Worker, 1944
Dixie comes to New York: story of the Freeport GI slayings  by Harry Raymond; intro. by Benjamin Davis New York, Daily Worker, 1946
The killing of William Milton by Art Shields New York, Daily Worker, 1948
The Ingrams shall not die!: story of Georgia's new terror by Harry Raymond; intro. by Benjamin J. Davis New York, Daily Worker, 1948
A tale of two waterfronts by George Morris (1952))
"Throw the bum out": official Communist Party line on Senator McCarthy. New York, Daily Worker, 1953–1954

See also
 Earl Browder
 Gus Hall
 David Karr
 People's World
 Whittaker Chambers:  foreign editor in the 1920s
 Jacob Burck:  cartoonist in the 1920s and 1930s
 Louis F. Budenz:  editor in early 1940s
 Lester Rodney:  sports writer/editor
 "The Race" (Seinfeld):  television episode prominently featuring the Daily Worker

Footnotes

Further reading

Articles
 Fetter, Henry D. "The Party Line and the Color Line: The American Communist Party, the Daily Worker and Jackie Robinson." Journal of Sport History 28, no. 3 (Fall 2001).
 Gottfried, Erika, "Shooting Back: The Daily Worker Photographs Collection," American Communist History, vol. 12, no. 1 (April 2013), pp. 41–69.
 Lamb, Christopher and Rusinack, Kelly E. "Hitting From the Left: The Daily Worker's Assault on Baseball's Color Line". Gumpert, Gary and Drucker, Susan J., eds. Take Me Out to the Ballgame: Communicating Baseball. Cresskill, NJ: Hampton Press, 2002.
 Rusinack, Kelly E. "Baseball on the Radical Agenda: The Daily and Sunday Worker Journalistic Campaign to Desegregate Major League Baseball, 1933-1947". Dorinson, Joseph, and Woramund, Joram, eds. Jackie Robinson: Race, Sports, and the American Dream. New York: E.M. Swift, 1998.
 Smith, Ronald A. "The Paul Robeson-Jackie Robinson Saga and a Political Collision". Journal of Sport History 6, no. 2 (1979).

Theses
 Evans, William Barrett. "Revolutionist Thought in the Daily Worker, 1919-1939". Ph.D. diss. University of Washington, 1965.
 Jeffries, Dexter. "Richard Wright and the ‘Daily Worker’: A Native Son’s Journalistic Apprenticeship". Ph.D. diss. City University of New York, 2000.
 Rusinack, Kelly E. "Baseball on the Radical Agenda: The Daily and Sunday Worker on Desegregating Major League Baseball, 1933-1947". M.A. Thesis, Clemson University, South Carolina, 1995.
 Shoemaker, Martha Mcardell. "Propaganda or Persuasion: The Communist Party and Its Campaign to Integrate Baseball". Master’s thesis. University of Nevada, Las Vegas, 1999.

Books
 
 Hemingway, Andrew. Artists on the Left: American Artists and the Communist Movement, 1926-1956. New Haven, Yale University Press, 2002.
 Schappes, Morris U. The Daily Worker: Heir to the Great Tradition. New York: Daily Worker, 1944.
 Silber, Irwin. Press Box Red: The Story of Lester Rodney, The Communist Who Helped Break the Color Line in American Sports. Philadelphia: Temple University Press, 2003.

External links

Daily Worker online at the Marxists Internet Archive 
Guide to the Daily Worker and  Daily World Photographs Collection  PHOTOS.223 Tamiment Library and Robert F. Wagner Labor Archives. New York University. 
Partial series archive at the Online Books Page
 The Daily Worker Cartoon Archive, Marxists Internet Archive. —Selected political cartoons from 1924 and 1926, listed by artist.
 Daily Worker FBI files. File number 61-275 Volume 5. Heavily redacted files from roughly 1948–late 1950s. Retrieved May 16, 2005.
 Baseball on the Radical Agenda by Kelly E. Rusinack.
 "A Sickening Red Tinge": The Daily Worker's Fight Against White Baseball by Kelly Rusinack and Chris Lamb. Cultural Logic, Volume 3, Number 1, Fall 1999.
Front page of the Daily Worker Vol. 2 #216 Dec. 1, 1924

Publications established in 1921
Publications disestablished in 1958
English-language communist newspapers
Communist periodicals published in the United States
Woody Guthrie
Communist Party USA publications
Defunct newspapers published in New York City
1921 establishments in New York (state)
1958 disestablishments in the United States
Daily newspapers published in New York City